John Clarence Patrick (November 25, 1898 – May 31, 1959) was an American rugby union player who competed in the 1920 Summer Olympics and 1924 Summer Olympics. He was a member of the American rugby union team, which won the gold medal at the both Olympics.

References

External links
profile

1898 births
1959 deaths
American rugby union players
Rugby union players at the 1920 Summer Olympics
Rugby union players at the 1924 Summer Olympics
Olympic gold medalists for the United States in rugby
United States international rugby union players
Medalists at the 1924 Summer Olympics
Medalists at the 1920 Summer Olympics